Lembit is an Estonian masculine given name. A variant is Lembitu. It sometimes also may be a surname. Lembit may refer to:
Lembitu (died 1217), Estonian elder and military leader from Sakala County
Lembit Arro (born 1930), Estonian politician
Lembit Eelmäe (1927–2009), Estonian actor
Lembit Kaljuvee (born 1952), Estonian politician
Lembit Kolk (1907–2003), Estonian politician
Lembit Küüts (born 1946), Estonian artist and politician
Lembit Lõhmus (born 1947), Estonian printmaker
Lembit Maurer (1929–2006), Estonian boxer and boxing coach
Lembit Oll (1966–1999), Estonian chess grandmaster
Lembit Öpik (born 1965), UK politician of Estonian descent
Lembit Peterson (born 1953), Estonian actor and theatre director
Lembit Rajala (born 1970), Estonian footballer
Anton Lembit Soans (1885–1966), Estonian architect, urban planner and lecturer
Lembit Sibul (1947–2001), Estonian humorist and stage actor
Lembit Uibo (born 1971), Estonian diplomat
Lembit Ulfsak (1947–2017), Estonian actor
Lembit Vahesaar (1936–2013),  Estonian chess and draughts referee

See also

References

Estonian masculine given names
Estonian-language surnames